Lists of Afghan provincial governors include a list of the current governors of provinces of Afghanistan, a list of governors appointed by the Taliban, and lists of governors of each province.

General

 List of current provincial governors in Afghanistan
 Taliban Provincial Governors

By province

 List of governors of Badakhshan
 List of governors of Badghis
 List of governors of Baghlan
 List of governors of Balkh
 List of governors of Bamyan
 List of governors of Daykundi
 List of governors of Farah
 List of governors of Faryab
 List of governors of Ghazni
 List of governors of Ghor
 List of governors of Helmand
 List of governors of Herat
 List of governors of Jowzjan
 List of governors of Kabul
 List of governors of Kandahar
 List of governors of Kapisa
 List of governors of Khost
 List of governors of Kunar
 List of governors of Kunduz
 List of governors of Laghman
 List of governors of Logar
 List of governors of Nangarhar
 List of governors of Nimruz
 List of governors of Nuristan
 List of governors of Paktia
 List of governors of Paktika
 List of governors of Panjshir
 List of governors of Parwan
 List of governors of Samangan
 List of governors of Sar-e Pol
 List of governors of Takhar
 List of governors of Urozgan
 List of governors of Wardak
 List of governors of Zabul